is a former Japanese rugby union player. He made his debut for Japan against a touring New Zealand Universities team in Osaka on 12 March 1967. He last appeared for Japan against England's under 23 team in Twickenham on 13 October 1973.

He inspired the Japanese TV series School Wars and the film School Wars: Hero which are based on his true story.

External links

Living people
Japanese rugby union players
Rugby union flankers
Nihon University alumni
1943 births
Japan international rugby union players